Moxlie Creek is a stream in Thurston County in the U.S. state of Washington. It is an Olympian creek originating from artesian springs in Watershed Park. It flows north into the East Bay of Budd Inlet. The creek is piped underground between East Bay and the headwaters, more than one third of its 1.8 mile length. For over 50 years the park groundwater was used to supply the city's drinking water, and waterworks remnants can be seen in the area.

Fecal coliform bacteria and other contaminants have been detected in the creek water. Occasionally, Chinook salmon, coho, and cutthroat trout can be found in the section of creek within the park (the salmon especially in September and October).

Moxlie Creek was named after R. W. Moxlie, an early settler.

Watershed
The  watershed extends southeast to Boulevard and Log Cabin Roads, west to portions of the South Capitol Neighborhood, and east to the top of the 4th Avenue hill.

See also 
Budd Inlet

References 

Rivers of Washington (state)
Geography of Olympia, Washington
Rivers of Thurston County, Washington